This is a list of the principal parks of Yerevan, the capital of Armenia.

Ajapnyak District
Tumanyan Park
Buenos Aires Park

Arabkir District
Vahagn Davtyan Park
Nor Arabkir Park

Avan District
Yerevan Botanical Garden
Avan Park
Family Park

Davtashen District
Davtashen Park

Erebuni District
Lyon Park
Liberators' Park

Kanaker-Zeytun District
Victory Park
David Anhaght Park
Paruyr Sevak Garden

Kentron District
English Park
Children's Park
Yerevan Children's railway
Tsitsernakaberd Park
Circular Park
Khachatur Abovyan Park
Lovers' Park
Martiros Saryan Garden
Komitas Garden
Moscow Garden
Shahumyan Garden
Missak Manouchian Garden
Cafesjian Sculpture Garden

Malatia-Sebastia District
Yerevan Park
Patriotic War Memorial Park
Youth Park
Vahan Zatikyan Park
Malatia Garden
Maternity Park
Love and Faith Park
Yuri Bakhshyan Park
Italian Park
Chinar Garden
Yerablur Park and Pantheon

Nork-Marash District
Nork Gardens

Nor Nork District
Yerevan Zoo
Fridtjof Nansen Park
Tatul Krpeyan Park
Vaspurakan Park
Tigranes the Great Park
Suren Nazaryan Garden

Nubarashen District
Nubarashen Central Park
Nubar Nubarian Park

Shengavit District
Komitas Park
Artur Karapetyan Park
Movses Gorgisyan Park
Shoghakat Park

References

Geography of Yerevan
Tourist attractions in Yerevan
Parks
Parks
Parks
Yerevan